Lydia Reed (born ) is an American former child actress who was known primarily for roles in 1950s films like The Vampire and High Society; she also appeared as Hassie in several seasons of the TV series The Real McCoys.

Biography 
Born in Mitchell Field, New York, Reed began a career as an actress as a child after attending the Professional Children's School. She appeared at first in Broadway productions before winning roles in film and television. Her Broadway debut came in Mrs. McThing with Helen Hayes. She gave up acting as a teenager.

Reed's education included three hours of schooling on the Desilu set. That ended at 12:30, after which she took afternoon classes at a private school in Hollywood. She also took classes two nights a week. She sought anonymity among students at the school by wearing her hair differently from what she did on TV and by adopting Tracy as her first name. 

Reed was one of three actresses who portrayed Kim Emerson on the television version of the soap opera Valiant Lady.

Selected filmography 
 Main Street to Broadway (1953)
 The Seven Little Foys (1955)
 Good Morning, Miss Dove (1955)
 High Society (1956)
 The Vampire (1957)
 The Real McCoys (1957–1963) (TV series)

References

External links
 

1940s births
Living people
Television child actresses
American child actresses
Actresses from New York (state)
American television actresses
21st-century American women